Hicham Elouaari (born 17 July 1986 in Charleville-Mézières) is a French former professional footballer who played as a forward.

He played professionally in Ligue 2 for Stade Reims.

His brother Abdelhakim Elouaari is a former footballer too.

References

External links
 

1986 births
Living people
Association football forwards
French footballers
Ligue 2 players
Stade de Reims players
Louhans-Cuiseaux FC players
Pacy Ménilles RC players
Wasquehal Football players
FC Dieppe players
Iris Club de Croix players
People from Charleville-Mézières
French sportspeople of Moroccan descent
Footballers from Grand Est
Sportspeople from Ardennes (department)